Mattia Rinaldini (born May 31, 1980 in Faenza) is a retired Italian professional football player.

External links
 

1980 births
Living people
Italian footballers
Serie B players
Ascoli Calcio 1898 F.C. players
Calcio Padova players
Ravenna F.C. players
S.S. Arezzo players
S.S.D. Varese Calcio players
A.C. Prato players
Benevento Calcio players
Association football midfielders